Mohammed Aliyu Datti (born 14 March 1982) is a Nigerian former footballer who played as a forward.

Career

Aliyu started his career with Padova.

References

External links
 
 sienaprofile
 

1982 births
Living people
Nigerian footballers
Nigeria international footballers
Nigerian expatriate footballers
A.C. Milan players
A.C. Monza players
A.C.N. Siena 1904 players
Standard Liège players
S.V. Zulte Waregem players
R.A.E.C. Mons players
Expatriate footballers in Italy
Expatriate footballers in Belgium
Serie A players
Serie B players
Belgian Pro League players
Association football forwards
Ravenna F.C. players
Calcio Padova players
Kaduna United F.C. players
K.F.C. Dessel Sport players
Niger Tornadoes F.C. players
K.A.A. Gent players
Sportspeople from Kaduna